Zhang Jian may refer to:

Name
 Zhang Jian (fencer) (born 1962), Chinese fencer
 Zhang Jian (football) (born 1965/66), Chinese football administrator
 Zhang Jian (businessman) (1853–1926), courtesy name Jizhi, Chinese entrepreneur, politician and educationist
 Zhang Jian (runner) (born 1976), Chinese middle distance runner
 Zhang Jian (sport shooter) (born 1985), Chinese sport shooter
 Zhang Jian (Tang dynasty) (died 651), Tang Dynasty noble
 Zhang Jian (footballer) (born 1989), Chinese footballer
 Zhang Jian (activist) (1970–2019), Chinese activist

Other
 Chinese oceanographic research ship Zhang Jian, Chinese oceanographic research ship

References
 Changchien